was a town located in Yūki District, Ibaraki Prefecture, Japan.

As of 2003, the town had an estimated population of 24,960 and a density of 569.34 persons per km². The total area was 43.84 km².

On January 1, 2006, Ishige merged with Mitsukaido; which was later renamed "Jōsō".

External links
 Jōsō official website 

Dissolved municipalities of Ibaraki Prefecture